Christopher Stollery  (born 12 August 1965) is an Australian television actor. He graduated from Australia's National Institute of Dramatic Art (NIDA) in 1987. He has had guest roles on many TV series and miniseries and is most well known for his role on Sea Patrol as Federal Agent Greg Murphy, a role he has held since the series premiere in 2007. He is also well known for his role on State Coroner as Sgt. Dermot McLeod. He has had leading roles on The Flying Doctors and A Country Practice. He has also had roles on All Saints, White Collar Blue and Water Rats. He played the role of Lieutenant Nick Homer in the film A Divided Heart (2005).

External links 
 

Living people
1965 births
Australian male television actors